19th World Sports Acrobatics Championships were held in Liévin, France from May 21 to May 23, 2004.

Results

Men's Group

Men's Pair

Mixed Pair

Women's Group

Women's Pair

References
FIG official site

Acrobatic Gymnastics Championships
Acrobatic Gymnastics World Championships
International gymnastics competitions hosted by France
World Sports Acrobatics Championships
World Sports Acrobatics Championships